Saman Samadi (born 1984) is a Persian-American composer, performer, music scholar, and current doctoral researcher at the University of Cambridge.

Biography
Over nearly two decades, Saman Samadi's prolific repertoire of orchestral, chamber, solo and electro-acoustic music has been performed internationally — in the mid & far East, Europe, and on both coasts of the United States. His music was inspired early by those composers who are known under the rubric New Complexity; however, in 2010, he commenced to develop his unique compositional approach, one which entails a new pitch space, utilising microtonal modes derived from traditional Persian music, multilayered & heterophonic textures, complex polyrhythms & polymeters; all traced within a detailed system of musical notation permitting replication. He received his degree in Mathematics from NODET, an Iranian educational institution for mathematical prodigies. He studied Philosophy and Critical Thinking at the University of Queensland, and Artistic Research at Orpheus Institute & Leuven University. He earned his BA in Music Performance & MA in Composition from the University of Tehran where he studied with Alireza Mashayekhi. From 2006 to 2009, Samadi was the director of the Concentus Orchestra, a mix of musicians from the Tehran Music Conservatory and the University of Tehran. He is a first-prize winner of the 2012 Counterpoint-Italy International Composition Competition and the 2009 Fajr International Music Festival. His work was selected for a premiere at the 2014 New York City Electroacoustic Music Festival. In 2013, he was offered a scholarship for doctoral studies in Composition at the State University of New York where he studied with Daria Semegen, to whom he was also an assistant at the Electronic Music Studio in Stony Brook. For the past half-decade, Samadi has been an active performer in New York City's Downtown Scene of experimental music and free improvisation. In 2018, he invited various alumni from the Manhattan School of Music to form the Saman Samadi Quintet. He is also the leader of two NYC-based ensembles, Āpām Napāt Trio, and Aži Trio. In 2015, Samadi was awarded an Artist Diploma from the New York Foundation for the Arts (NYFA). He is a former faculty member of the Music School of New York City, the Piano School of NYC, and the Editorial Officer of the Wolfson Research Event 2021. Samadi is the founder and director of the Cambridge University Experimental Music Ensemble. His current research is under the supervision of Richard Causton. Samadi is a Grantham Scholar and the President of Wolfson College Music Society at the University of Cambridge.

List of works
 Shattering in Seven Pieces for Dream and Wedding and Death, for string quartet — 2022
 Avec Boulez, Mallarmé, et Foucault, for ensemble — 2022
 Through a Veil, for wind quintet and fixed media — 2021
 Thus Spoke Earth, for violin and piano and fixed media — 2021
 Vāyuvēra, for Piano Trio — 2021
 Ānam Ārezust, for Ensemble — 2020
 Aša, for Flute — 2020
 The Gāthās for Piano — 2018–2019
 Ahunavaiti Gāthā no.1, stanza I
 Ahunavaiti Gāthā no.1, stanza II
 Ahunavaiti Gāthā no.1, stanza III
 Mira, for Violin and Electronics — 2015–2019
 Scheherazade, Saxophone Quartet No.2 — 2017
 Nostalgia, An electroacoustic album including five pieces – Samadis’ Records  Released: November 7, 2016 
 Ghorbat
 Berceuses
 Vāyu
 Retroception
 Hura
 Chamrosh, Works for Saxophone – Samadis’ Records  Released: April 1, 2016  
 Chamrosh, for Tenor Saxophone
 I-V-complex No.1, for Alto Saxophone and Piano
 I-V-complex No.2, for Saxophone Quartet
 Before Your Very Eyes, for Saxophone and Piano
 Apām Napāt, An electroacoustic album including sixteen pieces – piano, reeds, buchla – Samadis’ Records  Released: February 27, 2016
 Ap
 Asha
 Daeva
 Yima
 Ariyāramna
 Vivanhant
 Haoma
 Verethragna
 Yasna
 Apām Napāt
 Anahita
 Hauruuatāt
 Ahura
 Manu
 Zahhak
 Mithra
  Shekasteh Mouyeh, An electroacoustic album including nine pieces, Samadis’ Records  Released: February 23, 2015 
 Frenzied
 Shattered Mourning
 Injustice
 Desolation
 Ramkali
 Zenith
 Dissident
 Dashtestani
 Satori
 U-Turn, An electroacoustic album including five pieces, Samadis’ Records  Released: March 14, 2015  
 Safhe-ye Nakhl (Palm Plate), for Dozaleh, Piano, Tape and Live Electronics (2014)
 Amiri, for Electronics (2012)
 Ghatar-e Arvah (Ghosts' Train), for Electronics (2010)
 Magnapinna in Abdomen of a Newborn, for Electronics and video (2012)
 U-Turn, for Electronics and video (2011)
 Microtonal Piano Solos, An album including eleven pieces as a set, Samadis’ Records  Released: January 7, 2015
 Oracle
 Solitude
 Sisyphus
 Annica
 Perception
 Madman
 Satire
 Existence
 Deprivation
 Magnetic
 Subjectivity 
 Teryan, for Violin and Piano — 2014 
 Persia 1909, for Chamber Ensemble — 2014 
 Panj, for Orchestra — 2013 
 Gulhannai, for Piano — 2013 
 Tears' Scratch, for Violin duo — 2012 
 La Nausée, for Piano — 2012 
 Sound and Fury, for Chamber Orchestra — 2012 
 Paj, for Flute and Piano — 2011 
 Bazzad, for Violin and Symphony Orchestra — 2011 
 Symphony in Three Movements, for Large Orchestra — 2009 
 Impromptu, for Piano — 2008 
 Wine, for Piano — 2008 
 Eastern Rhapsody, for Piano — 2008 
 Sonatina, for Piano — 2008 
 Fog & Fugue, for Guitar — 2007  
 Camisado, for Chamber Orchestra — 2007 
 Is This the World We Created...?, for Alto, Baritone, Choir, and Orchestra — 2007  Duet for Horn and Piano, for Horn and Piano — 2007 
 Nausea, for Orchestra — 2007 
 A Piece for Violin and Orchestra — 2007 
 Two Nights, for Oboe, Horn, Violin, Cello, and Piano — 2007 
 Sheyda, for String Orchestra — 2006

References

University of Cambridge, Faculty of Music

Research Catalogue - an international database for artistic research

External links 
Saman Samadi's website
Cambridge University Experimental Music Ensemble
Wolfson College Music Society, Cambridge
Steinway Teachers
The New York City Electroacoustic Music Festival
New York Foundation for the Arts
Payvand News
The Journal of Music
New Complexity – Think:Listen

1984 births
21st-century classical composers
20th-century classical composers
Living people
Iranian composers
People from Tehran
Male classical composers
20th-century male musicians
21st-century male musicians